Kenwick, Western Australia is a mixed residential, light industrial and semi-rural suburb located in the south-east of Perth, Western Australia, located within the City of Gosnells. A large portion of the suburb is composed of remnant agricultural land organized as smallholdings of several acres, as well as relatively pristine native wetlands, including the Brixton Street Wetlands which are of significant conservation value.  It also contains several sites of historical significance relating to its status as one of the early farming communities of the Swan River Colony.

Kenwick is bounded on the south-west by the Canning River and on the north-west by the Roe Highway. Albany Highway, the main south-east arterial transport route, runs through the western part of the suburb.

Amenities

Historic sites

 Kenwick Pioneer Cemetery
 Liddelow Homestead

Commercial and retail

Kenwick contains a small local shopping centre in the main residential area, a mixed retail and commercial centre at the major highway intersection adjacent to the railway station, and numerous light industrial businesses located along Albany Highway.

Sporting and community

Lawn bowls, tennis courts, a skate park, a library and community centre, and an oval for cricket and football are all available for community usage. A significant sporting complex incorporating most of these activities is located at Mills Park in the north-west of the suburb.

Schools
 East Kenwick Primary School
 Kenwick School
 Rehoboth Christian College

See also
Kenwick railway station

References

External links

 
Suburbs of Perth, Western Australia
Suburbs in the City of Gosnells